The Festival International de Louisiane is an annual music and arts festival held in Lafayette, Louisiana celebrating the French heritage of the region and its connection to the Francophone world. The festival was first held in 1987 and has become very popular, attracting musicians, artists, and craftsmen from around the world. The festival is held outdoors, in Downtown Lafayette, the last full weekend in April, and is free to the public. Estimates for attendance include 400,000 in 2016. The festival was voted the "Best World Music Festival" by About.com readers in their 2012 and 2013 Readers' Choice Awards. 2020 saw a virtual event as the COVID-19 pandemic was to blame.

The stated mission of the festival is to:

French speakers live in the south central area of Louisiana known as Acadiana, and much of the local traditional music by Cajun and Creole musicians uses French lyrics. Bi-lingual radio and television announcers underscore the prevalence of French speakers in older, rural areas among both Cajun and Creole residents. The French Immersion programs in the area promote the language in charter schools while increasing connections to the rest of the French-speaking world. Festival International underscores Acadiana's connection to the Francophone world.

"Organizations such as Radio Canada, TV5Monde, Radio France, and Afropop Worldwide have reached out to Festival International officials to cover the event. In addition, the 2016 lineup of Francophone artists has attracted several government officials from the French-speaking world.

Participating artists

The festival draws musicians from around the world. Past performers include:

Alpha Blondy — Ivory Coast
Balkan Beat Box — Israel
BeauSoleil — United States
Bomba Estéreo — Colombia
Bonerama — United States
La Bottine Souriante — Quebec
Boukman Eksperyans — Haiti
Buckwheat Zydeco — United States
Ceux Qui Marchent Debout — France
Cyro Baptista — Brazil
DakhaBrakha — Ukraine
Dominique Dupuis — New Brunswick
The Duhks — Canada
Francis Cabrel — France
Gangsters d'Amour - Belgium
Gangbé Brass Band — Benin
Henry Gray and the Cats — United States
The Hooten Hallers — Missouri, United States
Dr. John — United States
Keb' Mo' — United States
Kiyoshi Nagata Ensemble — Toronto
Ladysmith Black Mambazo — South Africa
Locos Por Juana — United States
Los Lobos — California, United States
The Lost Bayou Ramblers — United States
MarchFourth Marching Band — United States
Maria de Barros — Cape Verde
 — Belgium
Pierre Kwenders — Democratic Republic of the Congo
Robert Randolph and the Family Band — United States
Sergent Garcia — France
Seun Kuti — Nigeria
Sharon Jones and the Dap-Kings — United States
Steve Riley and the Mamou Playboys — United States
Skatalites — Jamaica
Steel Pulse — England
Suroît — Magdalen Islands, Quebec
Tinariwen — Mali
Toubab Krewe — United States
Le Trou Normand — France
Väsen — Sweden
The Wailers Band — Jamaica
Yerba Buena — Cuba
Les Yeux Noirs — France

Details of the event

Festival International de Louisiane has a variety of music, performers and vendors from all over the world. It is free to attend the Festival, which is supported by donors, volunteers and by the attendees when they purchase a pin. There are over four stages and a children's area to celebrate International culture. Festival International de Louisiane happens the last weekend on April with opening ceremonies on Wednesday evening. The Festival closes out Sunday evening with an all artist music jam. The Festival is maintained 90% by volunteers.

See also
Cultures
Acadian
Cajun
Louisiana Creole people
Music
Cajun music
Music of Louisiana
Zydeco

References

External links

Official website
KRVS 88.7 public radio; KRVS broadcasts the festival
2011 Lineup for the Festival

Acadiana
Folk festivals in the United States
Ethnic music in the United States
French-American culture in Louisiana
Cajun culture
Music festivals in Louisiana
Culture of Lafayette, Louisiana
Tourist attractions in Lafayette Parish, Louisiana
Rock festivals in the United States
1987 establishments in Louisiana